The Khost rebellion, also known as the 1924 Mangal uprising, the Khost revolt or the Mangal Revolt was an uprising against the Westernization and modernizing reforms of Afghanistan’s king, Amanullah Khan. The uprising was launched in Southern Province, Afghanistan, and lasted from March 1924 to January 1925. It was fought by the Mangal Pashtun tribe, later joined by the Sulaiman Khel, Ali Khel, Jaji, Jadran and Ahmadzai tribes. After causing the death of over 14,000 Afghans, the revolt was finally quelled in January 1925.    

It was the first conflict to involve the Afghan Air Force.

Background 
Prior to 1924, the city of Khost had rebelled twice: the first rebellion took place from 1856 to 1857 and was fought by Khostwal and Waziri tribesmen against the rule of Dost Mohammad Khan. The second rebellion took place in 1912 and was a rebellion by the Mangal, Jadran, and Ghilzai tribes against the "rapacity and exactions" of the local governor, and saw Habibullah Khan's reign contested by Jehandad Khan.

There were multiple reasons for the rebellion in 1924, including opposition to the Westernizing reforms made by King Amanullah of Afghanistan, a code promulgated in 1923 called the "Nizamnama", which granted women more freedom and allowed the government to regulate other issues seen as family problems, which were formerly handled by religious authorities, a new law which restricted passage for the eastern tribes across the Durand Line, restrictions placed on the practice of polygyny, the abolition of child marriage, the imposition of property taxes, the "insolent, brazen and deceitful" actions of district chiefs, governors, and military officers, the bribery of ministers, judges and clerks, ignoring the pleas of "the needy", the increase of customs duties, a military draft, and other regulations which were aimed at "ending strife and violence".  

According to the contemporary Afghan historian Fayz Muhammad, the immediate cause of the revolt laid in a dispute, where a man from the Mangal tribe claimed he was betrothed to a woman, declaring that he had been engaged with her since childhood. Some of this man's enemies went to the governor of the southern province, Amr al-Din, and the qazi-magistrate, Abdullah, commonly known as Mullah-i-Lang or Pir-i-Lang (the lame Mullah), and disputed this claim. With consent of the fiancée, Amr-al Din rejected this claim, however, Mulla Abd Allah had been bribed to see that the fiancée had been betrothed, and complained that this rejection violated the Sharia, but this complaint was ignored, which led Mulla to make up his mind to instigate a rebellion.

Uprising

Uprising begins 
In mid-March 1924, the city of Khost, where protests had been ongoing since autumn 1923, erupted in an open rebellion against the government, led by Mulla Abd Allah. With appeals to Pashtun honour, incitements, and promises of paradise for true-believing Muslims, Mulla succeeded at raising all the tribes of the Southern Province against the Afghan government. Initially, the government did not take the uprising seriously, but by the end of March 1924 they had come to understand the seriousness of the situation.  

By mid-April, the entire Southern Province had begun participating in the rebellion. That same month, forces loyal to King Amanullah managed to defeat the Rebels, but could not rout them. The Rebels were then joined by the Alikhel and Sulaimankhel tribes. On 22 April, the rebels successfully ambushed a government regiment, inflicting severe casualties while suffering 20 deaths. On 27 April, an indecisive battle saw the rebels suffer 60 casualties against 7 government deaths and 27 government wounded. As resistance increased, the Afghan government sent a delegation to the rebels, arguing that Amanullah's reforms had not been in conflict with the Sharia, but these negotiations proved fruitless. Further fighting took place next May, when the government claimed to kill 117 rebels and wound another 365 more, for the cost of only 17 government deaths and 27 wounded, although these figures were regarded as unreliable by foreign observers.

The Loya Jirga 
In the midst of the rebellion, King Amanullah summoned an assembly of around 1000 tribal and religious leaders, a loya jirga, which he hoped would help legitimize his policies and therefore counter Mulla's religious claims. To his surprise, the majority of Ulama attending the assembly demanded the nullification of the reforms, which led Amanullah reluctantly withdraw some of his policies and begin negotiations in early June. On 20 June, peace talks broke down, and fighting resumed four days later.

Rise of Abd-al Karim 
In July, Abd-al Karim, the son of an ex-king of Afghanistan who was forced into exile in 1879, crossed from British India into Afghanistan to assume leadership of the rebellion and contest the throne of Afghanistan. at the end of that month, the Rebel tribes had cut communication lines between Kabul and Gardiz and advanced into the southern end of the Logar valley. Around this time, Mulla Abd Allah had been surpassed by Abd-al Karim as the leader of the revolt, and had been reduced to an advisory role. A battle on 13 July saw the Royal army lose 250 troops. A small government force was wiped out at Bedak on 2 August, and a larger force was destroyed soon after.

Habibullāh Kalakāni, future king of Afghanistan, also fought in the conflict. At the time, he served with the Royal Army's "Model Battalion" and served with distinction. Nevertheless, he deserted the unit at some unspecified time, and after working in Peshawar moved to Parachinar (on the Afghan border) where he was arrested and sentenced to eleven months imprisonment.

Ali Ahmad Khan, who had earlier played a leading role in the negotiations for the controversial Anglo-Afghan Treaty of 1919 which ended the Third Anglo-Afghan War rallied the Khogyani and Shinwari to help quell the rebellion.

Babrak Khan, a chieftain of the Zadran, died in this conflict, although details about for which side, when and how he exactly died in this rebellion are contradictory between sources. He was succeeded as chieftain by his son, Mazrak.

In Autumn 1924, the Rebellion had reached its height.

End of the uprising 
On 11 August 1924, King Amanullah declared holy war against the Rebels. On 25 August, Rebel forces successfully attacked Kulangar, where they destroyed 2 government battalions. Heavy fighting also took place in the Southern Province from 23 to 26 August, and 4 days later 1500 troops under Mir Zamer Khan defected to the government. On 16-17 September, Zamer Khan's force inflicted a major defeat on the rebels, killing 400-500 rebels at the cost of only 100 of his own men. This defeat prompted the Ahmadzai to withdraw from the rebellion. From 18 to 21 September, the government engaged a rebel force of 3,000 consisting of Sulaimankhel, Mangal and Zadran tribesmen.  In October, the Rebels managed to destroy an Afghan military detachment, and it seemed that the rebellion would march on Kabul. On 9-10 November, a raid by 500-600 rebel troops succeeded at inflicting 50-65 government casualties. The rebellion was finally quelled on 30 January 1925 with the imprisonment and execution of 40 Rebel leaders. Abd-al Karim evaded capture and fled back into the British Raj. Tom Lansford attributes the defeat of the rebels to the Royal Army's superior weapons and training. Louis Dupree instead attributes the defeat to Britain selling 2 World War I-era aircraft to Afghanistan, stating that they had "a salutory effect on tribal forces when they appeared on the scene, bombing and strafing the rebels."

Aftermath 
Over the course of the Rebellion, which Fayz Muhammad described as being suppressed "only with great difficulty", 14,000 people had perished, and the Afghan government lost £5 million in state revenue. Although unsuccessful, it succeeded in delaying many of the king's reforms until 1928.   

The defeat of the Khost rebellion was followed by reprisals on the Mangal population. 1515 men were executed, 600 women were dragged off to Kabul, and 3000 houses were burnt and razed to the ground. In the central square of Kabul, the Khost Monument was built, celebrating the "triumph of knowledge over ignorance".  

According to Waseem Raja, "The Khost Rebellion was important for two reasons. First it revealed the weaknesses of the Afghan army which remained poorly trained, underpaid and sadly lacking in medical facilities. Furthermore there was increasing discontent among the older officers many of whom had been superseded by younger European educated men. They deeply resented the fact that various modernization schemes had depleted the Amir's meagre financial resources at the expenses of the army. The revolt started the disunity in the country, the deterioration of administration, especially in the provinces and to check the disorderly progress of development in Afghanistan. Amanullah's dependence on the tribe to put down the rebellion only increased their already considerable power."

Alleged British involvement 
During the rebellion, The Afghan government portrayed rebel leaders as traitors seeking to serve British interests, and that the campaigns against the rebels were undertaken in the defense of Afghanistan against British influence. In British Raj however, it was generally suspected that the Soviet Union was responsible for providing financial and military aid to the rebels, while in the Soviet Union, the blame was put on Britain. Senzil Nawid writes that despite claims of British involvement by Afghan historians and the contemporary Afghan press, "neither the press reports nor Afghan historians have provided corroborating evidence for this theory". The British Library website claims that Britain supported the Afghan government.

See also 
 Khost rebellion (1912)
Afghan Civil War (1928–1929)

Notes

References
  

1924 in Afghanistan
Conflicts in 1924
1925 in Afghanistan
Conflicts in 1925
History of Khost Province
Military history of Afghanistan
Rebellions in Afghanistan